Department of Industries may refer to:
 Department of Industries (Kerala)
 Department of Industries (Tamil Nadu)